Youngman JNP6105GR is a low-floor single-decker bus manufactured since 2012 by Chinese bus manufacturer Youngman Automobile Group Co., Ltd. in Jinhua, Zhejiang, China. It is the shorter version of the 12.0m Youngman JNP6120GR plenibus.

Many of these buses were delivered to Citybus in Hong Kong to replace the ageing Volvo B6LE.

Launch 

Citybus was the launcher of this bus. Bus 1811 (license plate RN819) was registered on 31 July 2012 and entered service on 15 August 2012 operating route 76 between Shek Pai Wan and Causeway Bay (Moreton Terrace). Citybus currently owns 16 units and four of them have been converted into training buses in 2020.

Features 

The interior features a large display showing the next immediate stop and the three stops after it. The system is mounted on a handrail over the front offside wheelarch. This system is also installed on the lower deck of the latest Citybus Alexander Dennis Enviro500 double-decker buses.

The chassis is fully Super Low Floor, removing the need for kneeling and wheelchair ramps.

The rear door, manufactured by Ventura Systems of the Netherlands, are plug door type, meaning they slide outwards instead of opening conventionally. Many new buses in Hong Kong feature these doors.

The vehicle is fitted with a Euro 5 compliant MAN D0836 LOH65 common rail diesel engine, coupled with a 4-speed VOITH DIWA864.5 automatic transmission.

External links

JNP6105GR
Buses of China
Low-floor buses
Vehicles introduced in 2012